Warborough is a village and civil parish in South Oxfordshire, about  north of Wallingford and about  south of Oxford. The parish also includes the hamlet of Shillingford, south of Warborough beside the River Thames.

History
The toponym has evolved over the centuries. A property deed written about 1370 calls the village Wareburewe. In 1086 Warborough was part of the large royal estate of Benson.  The Church of England parish church of Saint Laurence was originally a chapel of the parish of Benson. There is a record of the Empress Matilda giving the benefice of Benson, including chapels at Nettlebed and Warborough, to the Augustinian Abbey at nearby Dorchester in about 1140, and for most of the Middle Ages Warborough was regarded as part of the parish of Dorchester.  It remained part of the Dorchester peculiar until 1847, but functioned largely as an independent parish from the Middle Ages.

St Laurences' Parish church
Perhaps the oldest item in the church is the font, which dates from late in the 12th century. The chancel has Decorated Gothic features from the early part of the 13th century, including the east window and one of the windows on the south side. The other windows of the chancel are later Perpendicular Gothic additions. The nave and south transept are Perpendicular features from the 14th century, although the transept arch and window are Decorated. The Gothic Revival architects G.F. Bodley and Thomas Garner restored the chancel in 1881. The Perpendicular Gothic windows in the nave are likewise Victorian. The bell-tower was rebuilt in 1666. Its two oldest bells were cast in 1618, and two more date from 1675. It had a ring of six bells, but in 1955 two new bells were cast and hung increasing the ring to eight.

Buildings
A date stone on the manor house on the north side of the village green says it was built in 1696. The vicarage is Georgian. Near the cruck cottage is a terrace of four cottages designed in 1952 by the architect Lionel Brett. The maltster Joseph Tubb (1805–79) lived in Warborough. In 1844–45 he carved the Poem Tree at Wittenham Clumps. Warborough and Shillingford Festival was founded in 1965. It is held annually in July.

Amenities
Warborough has a village shop and a public house:  The Six Bells. It used to have a second pub, The Cricketers, but this has now closed. The village has a pre-school and a Church of England primary school. Most secondary school pupils from the parish attend Wallingford School. The village green has a playground and sports pitches. Cross Keys and Warborough Football Club plays in Upper Thames Valley League Division I. The Greet Hall hosts the Warborough and Shillingford Women's Institute, a short mat bowls club and a jujitsu club and is the venue for parish council meetings.

In popular culture
The village and surrounding areas have been the subject of filming locations for the crime drama Midsomer Murders.

Gallery

References

Sources

External links

Villages in Oxfordshire
Civil parishes in Oxfordshire